HPV is human papillomavirus, a virus which causes human papillomavirus infection (HPV infection).

HPV may also refer to:

Science and technology
 Hepatic portal vein, a blood vessel
 Human-powered vehicle, a land, water or air vehicle powered by humans
 Hydrogen peroxide vapor, an antimicrobial vapor
 Hypoxic pulmonary vasoconstriction, a physiological phenomenon of the lungs

Other uses
 Health Purchasing Victoria, an Australian public authority

See also
 High production volume chemicals (HPV chemicals), produced or imported into the US in large quantities
 Papillomaviridae, the taxonomic family of human papillomavirus